Vanala is a village and former Rajput princely state on Saurashtra peninsula in Gujarat state, western India.

History 
The nearby archeological site of Rangpur, Gujarat dates back to the Harappan culture.

Vanala was a petty princely state in Jhalawar prant, comprising only Vana village, under a Jhala Rajput Chieftain.

During the British Raj, the petty state was under the colonial Eastern Kathiawar Agency.

Village 
Vanla lies in Chuda Taluka, Surendranagar district.
 
It is a tiny village of population of around 1100.

It has good road transport facilities from Limbdi (21 km) and Dhandhuka (10 km).

References

External links and sources 
 Imperial Gazetteer on DSAL.UChicago - Kathiawar

Villages in Surendranagar district